The European Round Table of Industrialists, abbreviated ERT, is an advocacy group in the European Union consisting of some 50 European industrial leaders working to strengthen competitiveness in Europe. The group works at both national and European levels.

History
The roots of the European Round Table of Industrialists date back to the early 1980s. The European economy at that time, was regarded as suffering from eurosclerosis, which was perceived as a lack of dynamism, innovation and competitiveness when compared with the economies of Japan and the United States. The negative economic consequences of the competitive situation worried several leading European businesspeople.

At the initiative of Pehr G. Gyllenhammar, the CEO of Volvo, 17 European businessmen met in the Paris boardroom of Volvo on 6 and 7 April 1983. They envisioned to create an organisation, which would be able to convey its message about the state of the economy to the European political leaders. The core message was that Europe needed to modernise its industrial bases in order to regain its competitiveness. The industry perceived a lack of a common European industrial development policy, in contrast to the European agricultural policy.

The meeting in Paris was attended by Pehr G. Gyllenhammar (Volvo), Karl Beurle (Thyssen), Carlo De Benedetti (Olivetti), Curt Nicolin (ASEA), Harry Gray (United Technologies), John Harvey - Jones (ICI), Wolfgang Seelig (Siemens), Umberto Agnelli (Fiat), Peter Baxendell (Shell), Olivier Lecerf (Lafarge Coppée), José Bidegain (Cie de St Gobain), Wisse Dekker (Philips), Antoine Riboud (BSN), Bernard Hanon (Renault), Louis von Planta (Ciba-Geigy) and Helmut Maucher (Nestlé). Both François-Xavier Ortoli and Étienne Davignon from the European Commission attended the meeting.

At the second meeting, on 1 June 1983 in Amsterdam, the ERT organisation was established, its charter accepted and the necessary financial arrangements were made. The goal of the ERT would be to promote competition and competitiveness on a European scale.

At the outset, the group played an important role in the planning of the Oresund Bridge between Denmark and Sweden as part of its European Link project on improvements to the European infrastructure. This project also included several other international European infrastructural projects e.g. the Fehmarn Belt Bridge between Denmark and Germany. Later on the ERT became active in the promotion of the earliest Trans-European Networks.

The ERT's busiest decade was 1988 to 1998 under different chairmen: Wisse Dekker (Netherlands), Jérôme Monod (France) and Helmut Maucher (Switzerland) with Keith Richardson as secretary general. During this time the ERT published influential reports in the domains of Internal Market, Infrastructure, Education, Environment, Information Society, Competitiveness, Job Creation and tax issues. The ERT fostered direct government-industry consultation at many different levels. Its active role in encouraging the first global G8 cooperation on building common standards for the Information Society was recognised by several country leaders, including President Bill Clinton.

From early on, ERT policy supported EU enlargement. It promoted and often led business dialogues between the EU and business circles in the US and in Japan as well as in developing countries. The ERT gave an early lead in presenting positive contributions to the climate change debate, and control carbon emissions. Two more recent areas for ERT contribution are pensions and international standards.

Chairmen

 1983 - 1988: Pehr G. Gyllenhammar (Volvo)
 1988 - 1992: Wisse Dekker (Philips)
 1992 - 1996: Jérôme Monod (Suez Lyonnaise des Eaux)
 1996 - 1999: Helmut Maucher (Nestlé)
 1999 - 2001: Morris Tabaksblat (Reed Elsevier)
 2001 - 2005: Gerhard Cromme (ThyssenKrupp)
 2005 - 2009: Jorma Ollila (Nokia)
 2009 - 2014: Leif Johansson (Ericsson)
 2014 - 2018: Benoît Potier (Air Liquide)
 Since 2018: Carl-Henric Svanberg (AB Volvo)

List of current members 2021 

 Hilde Merete Aasheim (Norsk Hydro)
Dolf van den Brink (Heineken)
 Jean-Paul Agon (L'Oréal)
 Zoltán Áldott (MOL)
 José Álvarez-Pallete (Telefónica)
 Nils S. Andersen (AkzoNobel)
 Paulo Azevedo (Sonae)
 Guido Barilla (Barilla S.p.A.)
 Martin Brudermüller (BASF)
 Paul Bulcke (Nestlé)
 Jean-Pierre Clamadieu (ENGIE)
 Ian Davis (Rolls-Royce)
 Rodolfo De Benedetti (CIR)
 Pierre-André de Chalendar (Saint-Gobain)
 Rafael del Pino (Ferrovial)
 Claudio Descalzi (Eni)
Stefan Doboczky (Lenzing AG)
 Henrik Ehrnrooth (KONE)
 Börje Ekholm (Ericsson)
 Christoph Franz (F. Hoffmann-La Roche)
 Ignacio S. Galán (Iberdrola)
 Paul Hermelin (Capgemini)
 Timotheus Höttges (Deutsche Telekom)
 Pablo Isla (Inditex)
 Simon Thompson (Rio Tinto)
 Jan Jenisch (LafargeHolcim)
 Leif Johansson (AstraZeneca)
 Ilham Kadri (Solvay)
Ola Källenius (Daimler)
Christian Klein (SAP)
 Joe Kaeser (Siemens)
 Thomas Leysen (Umicore)
 Helge Lund (BP)
 Pekka Lundmark (Nokia)
 Martin Lundstedt (AB Volvo)
 Florent Menegaux (Michelin)
 Lakshmi N. Mittal (ArcelorMittal)
 Stefan Oschmann (Merck Group)
 Benoît Potier (Air Liquide)
 Patrick Pouyanné (TotalEnergies)
 Alessandro Profumo (Leonardo S.p.A.)
 Jean-François van Boxmeer (Vodafone Group)
 Stéphane Richard (Orange)
 Gianfelice Rocca (Techint)
 Björn Rosengren (ABB)
 Güler Sabancı (Sabancı Holding)
 Søren Skou (A.P. Møller-Mærsk)
 Tony Smurfit (Smurfit Kappa Group)
Jim H. Snabe (Siemens)
Jonathan Symonds (GlaxoSmithKline)
 Johannes Teyssen (E.ON)
 Ben van Beurden (Royal Dutch Shell)
 Frans van Houten (Royal Philips)
 Jacob Wallenberg (Investor AB)
Peter Wennink (ASML Holding)
Oliver Zipse (BMW Group)

(Source: ERT.eu)

Critique of ERT
The Brussels Business - Who Runs the European Union is a 2013 documentary film by Friedrich Moser and Matthieu Lietaert which deals with the lack of transparency and the influence of lobbyists on the decision-making process in Brussels. ERT figures largely in the film as an organisation that has had the closest links with the reins of power in the EU, to the extent that certain EU reports, for instance those on European traffic networks, borrowed heavily from ERT reports.

In a report by the former secretary general of the ERT, Keith Richardson, entitled Big Business and the European Agenda, an ASEED Europe report called Misshaping Europe is quoted. The report was critical of the ERT's perceived success in influencing the European Commission:

References 

 Cowles, M., G., Setting the agenda for a new Europe: the ERT and EC 1992, In: Journal of Common Market Studies, 33, 1995,
 Cowles, M., G., The rise of the European multinational, In: International Economic Insights, 1993
 ERT, Will European governments in Barcelona keep their Lisbon promises?, Message from the European Round Table of Industrialists to the Barcelona European Council, March 2002. Brussel, feb. 2002
 
 Preston, M., E., The European commission and special interest groups,  In: Claeys, P.-H., Gobin, C., Smets, I., Lobbyisme, pluralisme et intégration Européenne. Brussel, Presses Interuniversitaires Européennes, 1998,

External links
 - European Round Table of Industrialists
 - EuropeOnTrack
 - Global Enterprise Project
 - InGenious - European Coordinating Body in science, technology, engineering and maths education
 - Initiative on Advancement of Women in Business

Business organizations based in Europe